The League of Social Democrats of Vojvodina (LSV) is an autonomist political party in Serbia. Its current leader since 19 November 2022 is Bojan Kostreš.

History 
The party was founded by Nenad Čanak on 14 July 1990 in Novi Sad. At the First Party Congress, the LSV adopted the party program, which defined following principles of the party: liberty, equality, justice, solidarity, and publicity. At the Second Congress, which was held in July 1997, the LSV adopted a new statute.

In the first years of its existence, the party's activities were mainly directed towards organization of anti-war actions. Together with other parties, it organized anti-war demonstrations in Vojvodina and publicly opposed mobilization of Vojvodina citizens for the front lines in Croatia and Bosnia and Herzegovina.

Ideology 
LSV is positioned on the centre-left on the political spectrum. It is mainly orientated towards autonomism, although the party is also social-democratic, and regionalist. It represents itself as a multi-ethnic party, and it previously advocated for the creation of Republic of Vojvodina. It is also supportive of feminism and anti-fascism. It is supportive of accession of Serbia to the European Union.

Goals 
The League advocates the "right of autonomous decisions about fundamental affairs of Vojvodina within Serbia", which, according to the League, was abolished after the so-called Yogurt Revolution in 1988 and after constitutional changes from 1990, which, according to the League, diminished the autonomy of Vojvodina to "protocolar minimum".

In December 1998, the League proclaimed that its political goal is establishment of the Republic of Vojvodina within a federalized Serbia. In recent years, the League mostly abandoned the idea of a Republic of Vojvodina, but it still advocated a greater level of autonomy for the province. In November 2011, League official Aleksandra Jerkov stated that "Vojvodina needs more jurisdictions", but that "there is no need for it to be a republic".

Presidents

Participation in elections

Parliamentary elections 
In the 1990 Serbian general election, the League supported candidates of the Union of Reform Forces of Yugoslavia and the Association for Yugoslav Democratic Initiative in several electoral districts.

{| class="wikitable sortable" style="text-align:center"
|+ National Assembly of Serbia
! Year
!Leader
! Popular vote
! % of popular vote
! # of seats
! Seat change
! Coalition
! Status
|-
! 1992
| rowspan="12" |Nenad Čanak
| 36,780
| 0.78%
| 
| 
| With NSS
| style="background:#ddd;"| no seats
|-
! 1993
| 41,097
| 0.96%
| 
| 
| With RDSV-SJ
| style="background:#ddd;"| no seats
|-
! 1997
| 112,589
| 2.72%
| 
|  3
| KV
| 
|-
! 2000
| 2,402,387
| 64.09%
| 
|  3
| DOS
| 
|-
! 2003
| 161,765
| 4.23%
| 
|  6
| ZZT
| style="background:#ddd;"| no seats
|-
! 2007
| 214,262
| 5.31%
| 
|  4
| With LDP-GSS-SDU-DHSS
| 
|-
! 2008
| 1,590,200
| 38.42%
| 
|  1
| ZES
| 
|-
! 2012
| 863,294
| 22.07%
| 
|  2
| IZBŽ
| 
|-
! 2014
| 204,767
| 5.70%
| 
|  3
| With NDS-Z-ZZS
| 
|-
! 2016
| 189,564
| 5.02%
| 
|  2
| With SDS-LDP
| 
|-
! 2020
| 30,591
| 0.95%
| 
|  4
| UDS
| style="background:#ddd;"| no seats
|-
!2022
|colspan="2"| did not participate
|
| —
| —
| style="background:#ddd;"| no seats
|}

 Provincial elections 
In the 2004 provincial election, the LSV was part of the Together for Vojvodina coalition. The coalition won 9.44% of the popular vote in the first-round of voting. The party subsequently participated in post-election provincial government.

In the 2008 provincial election, the LSV was again part of the Together for Vojvodina'' coalition. The coalition won 8.25% of the popular vote in the first-round of voting, representing a drop of -1.19% from the previous election. The party subsequently participated in post-election provincial government.

Presidential elections

Positions held 
Major positions held by League of Social Democrats of Vojvodina members:

Gallery

References

External links 

Official website

1990 establishments in Serbia
European Free Alliance
Political parties established in 1990
Politics of Vojvodina
Pro-European political parties in Serbia
Regionalist parties
Social democratic parties in Serbia
Feminist parties in Europe
Centre-left parties in Europe
Anti-fascism in Serbia
Multiculturalism in Europe